Homeworld 3 is an upcoming real-time strategy video game being developed by Blackbird Interactive and published by Gearbox Software. The game is scheduled to be released in the first half of 2023.

Gameplay 
Homeworld 3 is a 3D real-time strategy game set in space. According to the developers, following the responses to partner surveys, the game boasts an extensive campaign mode, giving solo gameplay an important role. As with the other games in the franchise, combat gameplay is built around an effective 3D ballistics system. One of new major gameplay features is huge megaliths and trenches; massive space structures that will add coverage strategies for small spacecraft. The game will launch with a new co-op mode that "will fuse Homeworld’s RTS gameplay with a roguelike structure"

Setting 
Homeworld 3 is set after the events of the previous two games. After a successful victory over the Vaygr, Karan S’Jet was able to open the ancient hyperspace gate network across the galaxy, unveiling the "Age of S'jet", an era of galactic trading and development, but this golden age seems to have reached the end: while she was opening gates at the edge of the galaxy, Karan disappeared and a mysterious scourge known as "The Anomaly" has started to spread across the galaxy, darkening entire star systems and threatening the existence of all sentient beings. One-hundred years after the disappearance of Karan, the fate of the galaxy is now in the hand of Imogen S'jet, her successor, who has dispatched a fleet in the hope of understanding and defeating the Anomaly.

Development 
The Homeworld series dates back to 1999. Following THQ's purchase of intellectual property rights to the franchise, further developments were halted after the release of Homeworld 2 in 2003. The franchise was dormant until 2013 when its rights were bought from THQ by Gearbox Software.

The announcement of Homeworld 3 follows the release of the Homeworld Remastered Collection, as well as the prequel Homeworld: Deserts of Kharak. The Remastered Collection's positive critical reviews and as well as the Deserts of Kharak's sales performance were enough  to convince publisher Gearbox and the affiliated development studio Blackbird Interactive to follow up with the creation of a new game, in direct continuity with the original saga.

The development of the game started around 2017 and, despite being already full funded by Gearbox, Blackbird Interactive launched a successful mixed crowdfunding/investment campaign on Fig in late 2019 which went on to generate the highest donation average in the platform's history. Along with this campaign the team allows contributors to take part in exclusive surveys, in order to determine which elements of the original trilogy were most appreciated and hence guide future development.

Some key personnel from the original development studio Relic (now working for Blackbird Interactive) are among the teams developing the game, namely design director Rob Cunningham, score creator Paul Ruskay, and Homeworld Cataclysm's writer Martin Cirulis. The number people working on the game is about 40.

Gearbox was acquired by Embracer Group in February 2021. As a result, Gearbox had to cancel the investment portion of the Fig campaign in June 2021, prior to obtaining money from those that had pledged to invest. No change was made to those that backed the game through the crowdfunding mechanism.

On 10 June 2022 it was revealed that Homeworld 3 has been delayed to the first half of 2023 and on 23 August during the Gamescom the first gameplay trailer was released.

References

External links
 

Upcoming video games scheduled for 2023
Homeworld (video game series)
Video games developed in Canada
Video game sequels
Real-time strategy video games
Multiplayer and single-player video games
Gearbox Software games
Windows games